Alessandra Medeiros de Oliviera (born 7 October 1981) is a Brazilian team handball player. She plays on the Brazilian national team, and participated at the 2011 World Women's Handball Championship in Brazil. She also competed at the 2000 Summer Olympics and the 2008 Summer Olympics.

References

1981 births
Living people
Brazilian female handball players
Brazilian expatriate sportspeople in Spain
Olympic handball players of Romania
Handball players at the 2000 Summer Olympics
Handball players at the 2008 Summer Olympics